"Thought You Should Know" is a song by American country music singer Morgan Wallen. It was released as a promotional single on May 6, 2022, and officially sent to country radio on November 7, 2022. It is the second single from Wallen's third studio album One Thing at a Time.

Content
Wallen co-wrote "Thought You Should Know" as a tribute to his mother, Lesli. He co-wrote the song with Miranda Lambert and Nicolle Galyon. The lyrics are about him having a change in personality and attributing it to his mother's upbringing. The accompaniment features slide guitar and acoustic guitar.

Chart performance
"Thought You Should Know" debuted at number one on the Billboard Hot Country Songs chart dated for May 21, 2022. The song is Wallen's fourth to debut at the top of that chart. Additionally, it replaced Wallen's "Wasted on You" at the top, making him the first artist to replace himself at the top with a No. 1 debut. It entered the Top 10 on the Billboard Country Airplay chart dated December 31, 2022, at the same time that Wallen's previous single "You Proof" was at number one.

Charts

Weekly charts

Year-end charts

Certifications

Release history

Notes

References

2022 songs
Big Loud singles
Mercury Nashville singles
Morgan Wallen songs
Republic Records singles
Songs written by Morgan Wallen
Songs written by Nicolle Galyon
Songs written by Miranda Lambert
Song recordings produced by Joey Moi
Songs about mothers